Kings Throne Peak is a  mountain summit in the Dalton Range of the Saint Elias Mountains, in Kluane National Park of Yukon, Canada. The mountain's descriptive name comes from how it is shaped by a cirque on the north aspect. A rock glacier descends from the cirque to the lake. A steep five kilometre trail provides access to the amphitheatre, and an additional three kilometres on a beaten path reaches the summit via the east ridge. Based on the Köppen climate classification, Kings Throne Peak is located in a subarctic climate zone with long, cold, snowy winters, and mild summers.

See also
 
List of mountains of Canada
Geography of Yukon

References

External links
 Parks Canada website: Kings Throne trail
 Flickr photo: View of the cirque
 Flickr photo: Kings Throne Peak with Kathleen Lake

One-thousanders of Yukon
Saint Elias Mountains
Kluane National Park and Reserve